Dieudonné Smets (17 August 1901 – 29 November 1981) was a Belgian racing cyclist. He won the 1926 edition of the Liège–Bastogne–Liège.

References

External links
 

1901 births
1981 deaths
Belgian male cyclists
People from Oupeye
Cyclists from Liège Province